Vasilseverginite is a very rare arsenate-sulfate mineral with formula Cu9O4(AsO4)2(SO4)2. Its structure is of a new type. It possesses a typical feature of many minerals of its type locality, the Tolbachik volcano, namely being a salt with oxide anions. However, it is the first Tolbachik copper oxysalt that is both arsenate and sulfate. Vasilseverginite is monoclinic, with space group P21/n.

References

Copper(II) minerals
Arsenate minerals
Sulfate minerals
Monoclinic minerals
Minerals in space group 11